Thomas Swann (born 15 October 1987) is an Australian rower. He competed in the Men's eight event at the 2012 Summer Olympics.

Performances

 2nd (eight) - 2012 World Cup 3 (Munich, Germany)
 6th (eight) - 2012 World Cup 2 (Lucerne, Switzerland)
 4th (eight) - 2011 World Championships (Bled, Slovenia)
 7th (eight) - 2011 World Cup 3 (Lucerne, Switzerland)
 4th (four) - 2011 Australian Rowing Championships (West Lakes, South Australia)

Highlights

 Silver Medal : 2010 Rowing World Cup in Lucerne, Switzerland (men's eight)
 Bronze Medal : 2007 U23 World Championships in Strathclyde, Scotland (men's quad)

References

External links
 

1987 births
Living people
Australian male rowers
Olympic rowers of Australia
Rowers at the 2012 Summer Olympics
People from Echuca
21st-century Australian people